Where Are You Really From? is an Australian television documentary ancestry series, which first screened in 2018 on SBS. Comedian Michael Hing visits migrants and their descendants to learn about their heritage and communities around Australia.

Episodes

Season One (2018)

Season Two (2019)

Season Three (2020)

References

External links
 Official website

See also
 Who Do You Think You Are?

2010s Australian documentary television series
2018 Australian television series debuts
Television series about family history
Special Broadcasting Service original programming
English-language television shows